The Portrait of Fra Antonio Martelli (c. 1607/1608) is a painting by the Italian master Michelangelo Merisi da Caravaggio, in the Palazzo Pitti, Florence.

Attribution
Until recently it was thought that this painting represented Alof de Wignacourt, Grand Master of the Order of the Knights of Malta, and that it was a preparatory study for the large and famous Portrait of Alof de Wignacourt and his Page, but recent documentary discoveries indicate that it is the portrait of another prominent member of the Order, Antonio Martelli of Florence, Prior of Messina.

See also
List of paintings by Caravaggio

External links

1600s paintings
Paintings by Caravaggio
Paintings in the collection of the Galleria Palatina